Anne Aasheim (22 April  1962 – 30 March 2016) was a Norwegian editor.

She was born in Porsgrunn and started her journalist career in the neighboring city's largest newspaper Varden in the late 1970s. She worked in Dagen and Bergens Arbeiderblad before being hired in NRK Hordaland in 1988.

She served as acting director of NRK P3 in Trondheim and NRK P2 in Oslo before being appointed as director of the local news post Østlandssendingen in 1997. In 1999 she served as acting director of culture in the news corporation, before serving as director of national and district news from 2001 to 2005. After a period as editor-in-chief of Dagbladet from 2006 to 2010, she resigned and became the new managing director of the Arts Council Norway in 2011.

She was married to researcher Mette Tollefsrud, resided in Ila, Oslo.

Aasheim died of lung cancer in Oslo in 2016.

References

1962 births
2016 deaths
People from Porsgrunn
NRK people
Dagbladet people
Norwegian newspaper editors
Norwegian women editors
Norwegian LGBT writers
Deaths from lung cancer in Norway
21st-century Norwegian LGBT people